Samuel Opone (13 June 1942 – November 2000) was a Nigerian footballer. He competed in the men's tournament at the 1968 Summer Olympics.

References

External links
 

1942 births
2000 deaths
Nigerian footballers
Nigeria international footballers
Olympic footballers of Nigeria
Footballers at the 1968 Summer Olympics
People from Delta State
Association football defenders
Stationery Stores F.C. players